Dryas may refer to:

Biology 
 Dryas (plant), a genus of plants
 Dryas, a monotypic genus of butterflies containing the single species Dryas iulia
 Dryas monkey (Cercopithecus dryas), a little-known species of guenon found only in the Congo Basin

Geology
 Dryas, the name of several climatic periods, named for their abundant dryas flowers:
 Oldest Dryas
 Older Dryas
 Middle Dryas
 Younger Dryas

Other uses
 Dryas (mythology), several characters in Greek mythology
 Drias, Kavala, or Dryas, a village in Greece

See also
 Dryad (disambiguation)